The Lovers' Wind is a 1978 French documentary film directed by Albert Lamorisse about the landscape of Iran. Lamorisse was killed in a helicopter crash while filming the documentary, during a helicopter-tour of Iran. His widow and son completed the film, based on his production notes, and released the film eight years later in 1978. It was nominated for a posthumous Academy Award for Best Documentary Feature.

References

External links

1978 films
1978 documentary films
1970s French-language films
French documentary films
Films directed by Albert Lamorisse
Documentary films about Iran
1970s French films